A referendum on autonomy was held in Martinique on 7 December 2003, alongside an identical referendum in Guadeloupe. Voters were asked whether they wanted the island to become a territorial collectivity. The proposal was rejected by 50.48% of voters.

Results

References

2003 referendums
Referendums in Martinique
2003 in Martinique
Autonomy referendums